is a member of Komeito serving in the Japanese House of Representatives, a position that he has been elected to two times. He is supportive of casinos in Japan, saying that they will help the economy and "will give foreigners something to do at night".

References

1975 births
Living people
Komeito politicians
Members of the House of Representatives (Japan)